Assam Police Blues (formerly Assam Police Football Team) is an Indian institutional football club based in Guwahati, Assam. The club currently competes in the GSA Super Division Football League.

History
Assam Police Football team has very rich and memorable history. In 1970, the team shocked the Calcutta giant Mohammedan SC in the final of the Bordoloi Trophy. It produced star footballers like Gilbertson Sangma, Kalimuddin, Jewel Bey etc. The team has also appeared in the two seasons of National Football League II (NFL 2nd Division), then second tier of Indian football league system in 1998-99 and 2006-07.

Honours

League
Assam State Premier League
 Champions (1): 2013–14	
 Runners-up (1): 2009–10

Assam Club Championship 
 Champions (2) 1998, 2005-06

GSA Super Division Football League
 Champions (3) 2004, 2005, 2006

Cup
Bordoloi Trophy
 Winners (5): 1960, 1971, 1981, 1995, 1997
 Runners-up (1): 1988
ATPA Shield
 Winners (3) 1971, 1982, 1983
 Runners-up (3): 1990, 2002, 2017
Independence Day Cup
 Runners-up (1): 2006
Bodoland Martyrs Gold Cup
 Runners-up (1): 2016
Amba Medhi Football Tournament
 Winners (4): 1988, 1996, 1999, 2003
Sohanlal Dugar Shield
 Runners-up (1): 2003

See also
 List of football clubs in Assam

References

Football clubs in Assam
Police association football clubs in India